819 Naval Air Squadron (819 NAS) was a Naval Air Squadron of the Royal Navy's Fleet Air Arm.

History
Along with No. 815 Squadron, it performed the successful night attack on the Italian fleet at Taranto on 11 November 1940. The attack was performed with Swordfish torpedo bombers from the aircraft carrier Illustrious.

More recently, 819 operated Sea Kings HAS6 from HMS Gannet at Prestwick Airport. Constituted to have two flights supporting RFA ships and one SAR flight. In 2001, 819 NAS was decommissioned; its SAR flight transitioning into [Gannet SAR Flight] and now operating the Sea Kings HU5. Gannet SAR Flight went on to be one of the busiest SAR flights in the UK and holds the record for the most callouts in a single year. It decommissioned on 1 January 2016 as part of the contractorisation of military SAR.

Aircraft operated
The squadron operated a variety of different aircraft and versions:
 Fairey Swordfish I, II & III
 Grumman Wildcat IV, V & VI
 Westland Whirlwind HAS.7
 Westland Wessex HAS.1 & HAS.3
 Westland Sea King HAS.1, HAS.2/2A, HAS.5 & HAS.6

References

Citations

Bibliography
 Jackson, Robert, The Encyclopedia of Military Aircraft, Parragon Books, Ltd. 2006 

800 series Fleet Air Arm squadrons